Romance on the Range  is a 1942 American Western film directed by Joseph Kane and starring Roy Rogers, George "Gabby" Hayes, Sally Payne, Linda Hayes, and Sons of the Pioneers.

Cast
 Roy Rogers as Roy Rogers
 George "Gabby" Hayes as Gabby
 Sally Payne as Sally
 Linda Hayes as Joan Stuart
 Edward Pawley as Jerome Banning
 Harry Woods as Henchman Steve
 Hal Taliaferro as Sheriff Wilson
 Glenn Strange as Stokes, Henchman
 Roy Barcroft as Pete, Henchman
 Sons of the Pioneers as Musicians, cowhands

References

External links
 

1942 films
1942 Western (genre) films
Republic Pictures films
American Western (genre) films
American black-and-white films
Films directed by Joseph Kane
1940s English-language films
1940s American films